Hori Mahato is the protagonist of 1936 Hindi-language political novel, Godaan by Indian author Munshi Premchand. He is portrayed as a poor, feeble and helpless farmer who is weighed under the compounding interest of Zamidars and straight away tax.

Hori is married to Dhania, who is devoted to him but she is intolerable to injustice and cannot see any type of unrighteousness, injustice and oppression. Hori had a wish accumulated in his heart since long time to purchase a cow, but he is unable to do so due to his extremely poor condition. His wish got fulfilled by Bhola, a cowherd of another village but soon his fortune turned to bad luck as his own jealous brother, Heera killed his cow.

References 

Hindi novelists
Hindi-language literature